David Levi Strauss (born March 10, 1953 in Junction City, Kansas) is an American poet, essayist, art and cultural critic, and educator. He is the author of a book of poetry, four books of essays, and numerous monographs and catalogues on artists. He was Chair of the graduate program in Art Writing (formerly Art Criticism & Writing) at the School of Visual Arts in New York City from 2007 until that program closed in 2021. He also taught at the Center for Curatorial Studies at Bard College from 2001–2005, and since 2002 he has continued to teach in the Milton Avery Graduate School of the Arts at Bard.

Strauss’ principal subject in his books of essays has been the relation between aesthetics and politics. He has been called “the undisputed champion of literary art writing,” and writer Lucy Sante called him “photography’s troubled conscience.”

Strauss’ critiques and theories about the role and influence of art and photography on society are frequently cited in the works of other contemporary writers and critics.

Life and work 

David Levi Strauss was born in Junction City, Kansas in 1953, and grew up just down the road in Chapman, where his grandfather was a blacksmith and his father a mechanic. His mother, Viola Lee, worked as a secretary for the local school district.

After writing and distributing a political tract critical of his high school’s administration, he was threatened with expulsion, but enrolled in Kansas State University anyway, where he spent two years studying political science and philosophy before being asked to leave after organizing a march on the ROTC building to protest Nixon’s Cambodian bombings in 1973 and a student strike to protest the firing of a radical history professor. At age 21, he traveled around the world on a floating university, collecting children’s art in Japan, China, Indonesia, India, and Africa, and studying the radical pedagogy of Paulo Freire. After returning to the U.S., he studied philosophy and photography at Goddard College in Vermont, graduating with a B.A. in 1976, and studied photography and language with Nathan Lyons at Visual Studies Workshop in Rochester, New York.

In 1978 he moved to San Francisco, where he studied in the Poetics Program at New College of California with poets Robert Duncan, Diane Di Prima, Michael Palmer, David Meltzer, and Duncan McNaughton, from 1980 to 1985, and edited and published ACTS: A Journal of New Writing (1982-1990). ACTS published books on Analytic Lyric (1987), Jack Spicer (1987) and Paul Celan (1988), all co-edited with Benjamin Hollander. ACTS was funded by Strauss' work as Robert Duncan's gardener, and printed with the mimeograph Duncan used to print "Dante Etudes."

In 1993 Strauss left San Francisco for New York, where he currently resides in the Hudson Valley and in New York City with his wife, the painter Sterrett Smith. Their daughter, Maya Grace Strauss, also a painter, graduated with honors from The Cooper Union for the Advancement of Science and Art in New York in 2012.

In December 2014, Strauss was interviewed by Wired on the Obama administration's refusal to release photographs of torture at Abu Ghraib, which Strauss had been writing about since 2004. He told the interviewer, “I want more images. In that way, I guess you could say I have gotten what I want, since today’s communications environment makes more and more images available to us all the time.”

David is not related to Claude Lévi-Strauss.

Recognition
In his introduction to Strauss’ book Between the Eyes, John Berger wrote, “Strauss, who is a poet and storyteller as well as being a renowned commentator on photography (I reject the designation critic) looks at images very hard . . . and comes face-to-face with the unexplained. Again and again. The unexplained that he encounters has only little to do with the mystery of art and everything to do with the mystery of countless lives being lived.” And Arthur Danto wrote, “David Levi Strauss is an art critic of exceptional originality and depth. I can think of none in this field I would rank ahead of him in terms of his knowledge, his seriousness, his adventure, and the power of his writing.”

Strauss received a Guggenheim Fellowship in 2003–04, and the Infinity Award for Writing from the International Center of Photography in 2007. The selection committee for the latter wrote, “His special perspective on ways of seeing has shaped our understanding of the changing nature of visual media.”

Books 

Manoeuvres: Poems 1977-1979 In 1980, Diane di Prima’s Eidolon Editions and Aleph Press in San Francisco published Strauss’ first book of poetry.
Between Dog & Wolf: Essays on Art & Politics In 1999, the anarchist collective in Brooklyn, Autonomedia, published a book of Strauss’ essays, Between Dog & Wolf. In 2010, it was reprinted by Autonomedia, with a new prolegomena by Hakim Bey.
Between the Eyes: Essays on Photography and Politics In 2003, Between the Eyes, with an introduction by John Berger, was published by Aperture. A paperback edition appeared in 2010, and an Italian edition, Politica della Fotografia, was published by Postmedia Books in Milan, Italy, in 2007, translated by Gianni Romano.
From Head to Hand: Art and the Manual In 2010, Oxford University Press published a collection of essays on art and the manual titled From Head to Hand.
Words Not Spent Today Buy Smaller Images Tomorrow: Essays on the Present and Future of Photography Strauss' latest book was published by Aperture in 2014.
In 2019, Miles McEnery Gallery published, Judy Pfaff that includes David Levi Strauss essay titled, Pfaff's Four Quartets: Navigating the Chaos.

References

External links
 http://bombmagazine.org/article/2690/david-levi-strauss
 http://saint-lucy.com/conversations/david-levi-strauss/
 http://www.brooklynrail.org/2014/07/art/david-levi-strauss-with-jarrett-earnest
 http://www.brooklynrail.org/2004/01/art/david-levi-strauss
 http://www.brooklynrail.org/2014/12/art_books/the-ten-best-art-books-of-2014
 http://artcriticism.sva.edu/?faculty=david-levi-strauss
 https://web.archive.org/web/20120515131736/http://www.aperture.org/exposures/?tag=david-levi-strauss
 http://www.caareviews.org/reviews/2504
 http://www.publishersweekly.com/978-1-59711-271-0

Living people
1953 births
American art critics
School of Visual Arts faculty
Visual Studies Workshop alumni